Solo 8: Classic Jazz is a solo piano album by Franco D'Andrea. It was recorded in 2001 and released by Philology Records.

Recording and music
Material for this and seven other solo piano CDs was recorded over the period of three mornings and two afternoons in April 2001. The compositions are traditional jazz pieces.

Release and reception

Solo 8 was released by Philology Records. The AllMusic reviewer suggested that "once a buyer has had an opportunity to hear some of his other solo releases it's a safe bet that this intriguing disc will join the others in his or her collection".

Track listing
"C Jam Blues / Muskrat Ramble"
"Black and Blue / Do You Know What It Means to Miss New Orleans / Struttin'"
"I've Found a New Baby"
"Charleston / Way Down Yonder in New Orleans / Basin Street Blues"
"Savoy Blues / Twelfth Street Rag"

Personnel
Franco D'Andrea – piano

References

Franco D'Andrea albums
Solo piano jazz albums